Krzysztof Maciejewski can refer to:

 Krzysztof Maciejewski (footballer)
 Krzysztof Maciejewski (politician)